Raf Alfred Manji (born ) is a New Zealand politician, with a background in governance, finance and social enterprise. He is currently leader of The Opportunities Party (TOP).

Early life
Manji was born in London to an Indian Muslim father and Irish Catholic mother and educated at the University of Manchester, graduating with a degree in economics and social studies. He worked as an investment banker, before migrating to New Zealand in 2002. He worked for non-profits and volunteering before becoming involved in the Volunteer Army Foundation.

Political career

Manji was elected to the Christchurch City Council in the Fendalton-Waimairi ward in 2013 after being encouraged to run by mayor Lianne Dalziel. He quickly became Dalziel's right-hand man on finance issues, acting as serving as deputy chair on financial committees and helping to manage the post-earthquake rebuild. He was re-elected in the Waimairi Ward in 2016.

Manji contested the seat of Ilam, which had been a safe seat for the National Party, as an independent at the 2017 New Zealand general election. He campaigned on a platform of being a voice for Christchurch during its recovery from the 2011 Christchurch earthquake, including promoting the idea of an investment fund for local housing, and Christchurch bidding to host the 2026 Commonwealth Games. Manji polled well behind incumbent National Party MP Gerry Brownlee, but came second, polling ahead of the Labour Party candidate.

He retired from the Christchurch City Council at the 2019 New Zealand local elections. 

Following the 2019 Christchurch mosque shootings Manji suggested that inequality resulting from financial deregulation had helped radicalise alt-right terrorism. He was subsequently appointed to chair an advisory group to decide how to use money raised to support the victims. Following the approach used after the Grenfell Tower fire he established a "listening project" and spent months meeting with victims and hearing their stories. In November 2020 he advocated for a $34.8 million government compensation package to victims and their families.

On 27 January 2022 he was announced as the new leader of The Opportunities Party.

References

1960s births
Living people
People from London
New Zealand people of Pakistani descent
English emigrants to New Zealand
Alumni of the University of Manchester
Christchurch City Councillors
The Opportunities Party leaders
The Opportunities Party politicians
Unsuccessful candidates in the 2017 New Zealand general election